The Life and Hard Times of Guy Terrifico is a Canadian mockumentary film released in 2005. Written and directed by Michael Mabbott, the film stars Matt Murphy, a musician previously associated with the bands The Super Friendz and The Flashing Lights, as Guy Terrifico, a country singer long rumoured to have died three decades earlier, but now reemerging from his disappearance and releasing a new album.

Murphy and Mabbott wrote the film's music, including the songs "Just a Show" and "Make Believe", which were nominated for Best Original Song at the 26th Genie Awards.

The film won the award for Best Canadian First Feature Film at the 2005 Toronto International Film Festival. In December 2005, it was named to TIFF's annual Canada's Top Ten list of the year's best Canadian films.

Cast
 Matt Murphy as Guy Terrifico
 Natalie Radford as Mary Lou Griffiths
 Jane Sowerby as Loni Lipvanchuck
 David Christo as Guy Jr.
 Lyriq Bent as Mr. Stuff
 Kris Kristofferson as himself
 Merle Haggard as himself
 Colin Linden as himself
 Ronnie Hawkins as himself
 Donnie Fritts as himself
 Levon Helm as himself
 Jim Cuddy as himself
 Greg Keelor as himself
 Rob Bowman as himself
 George Stroumboulopoulos as himself
 Phil Kaufman as himself

References

External links
 

2005 films
Canadian musical comedy films
Canadian mockumentary films
2000s musical comedy films
Country music films
2005 comedy films
English-language Canadian films
2000s English-language films
2000s Canadian films